Khudayar Muslum oglu Yusifzade (15 July 1998 – 22 October 2020) was an officer of the Azerbaijani army and Warrant officer.

He was killed on 22 October 2020 during the 2020 Nagorno-Karabakh war.

Awards 
The Fatherland medal ribbon 
Flag order ribbon           
For liberation medal ribbon

Early life 
Khudayar Yusifzadeh was born on 15 July 1998 in the city of Barda. Twenty-four days after his birth, he lost his father (Muslim Yusif oglu), a well-known accordionist in Barda.  There were 4 children in the Yusifzade family - 3 brothers and 1 sister. Khudayar Yusifzadeh was the last child in the family. He graduated from the Children's Art School No. 1 named after Bulbul in Barda.

Career 
He was a warrant officer of the State Border Service.

After Tovuz clashes, he volunteered to serve. After the Azerbaijani army captured Fuzuli, he began serving at the newly established border checkpoint there. He voluntarily took part in the battles in the direction of Kalbajar, Jabrayil, Zangilan.

He took part in the battles for Murovdag heights in the direction of the Kalbajar region. After a while, he fought in the direction of Fuzuli, Jabrayil, Zangilan. He showed courage in capturing the village of Aghbend in Zangilan.

He died on 22 October, in the Aghbend direction. He was 22.

"Vətən yaxşıdır" song 
Two days before the fighting, he videotaped himself with his comrades-in-arms while singing the song "Vətən yaxşıdır" written in the words of Aliagha Vahid. The video became a trend on social networks.

See also 
 2020 Nagorno-Karabakh war
 Aras Valley campaign

References 

1998 births
2020 deaths
People from Barda, Azerbaijan
Azerbaijani Land Forces personnel of the 2020 Nagorno-Karabakh war
People killed in the 2020 Nagorno-Karabakh war